Mount Herbert may refer to:

Mount Herbert, Prince Edward Island, a town on Prince Edward Island, Canada
Mount Herbert (New Zealand), a mountain in the South Island of New Zealand
Mount Herbert (New Zealand electorate), a former parliamentary electorate 
Mount Herbert (Papua New Guinea), a mountain named after Herbert von Bismarck. See Mount Wilhelm